was a Japanese author.

Born in Tokyo, he accompanied his parents to Korea, when the country was still under Japanese colonial rule. After the war, he returned to Japan, graduating from the University of Tokyo and joining the staff of the Yomiuri Shimbun, a leading Japanese newspaper, in 1952. He served as a foreign correspondent in South Korea and Vietnam before becoming a novelist. 

Though he is often described as an environmentalist author, the focus of much of his fiction is the urban physical environment. Hino's works are striking for being simultaneously autobiographical and surrealistic. His novel Yume no Shima has been translated into English by Charles de Wolf as Isle of Dreams, and into German by Jaqueline Berndt and Hiroshi Yamane as Trauminsel; a short story, Bokushikan, has been translated into English by Charles de Wolf as The Rectory; another short story, Hashigo no tatsu machi 梯の立つ街, has been translated by Lawrence Rogers as "Jacob's Tokyo Ladder" and printed in 2002's Tokyo stories: a literary stroll.

Selected works 
 Seinaru kanata e : waga tamashii no henreki, Kyoto : PHP Kenkyūjo, 1981.
 Hōyō, Tokyo : Shueisha, 1982.
 Tenmado no aru garēji, Tokyo : Fukutake Shoten, 1982.
 Kagaku no saizensen, Tokyo : Gakuseisha, 1982.
 Seikazoku, Tokyo : Kawade Shobō Shinsha, 1983.
 Nazukerarenu mono no kishibe nite, Tokyo : Shuppan Shinsha, 1984.
 , Tokyo : Kodansha, 1985. Translated as Isle of Dreams by Charles de Wolf: Dalkey Archive Press, 2010.
 , Tokyo : Chūō Kōronsha, 1986.
 , Tōkyō : Sakuhinsha, 1987.
 , Tokyo : Shueisha, 1987.
 , Tokyo : Shinchōsha, 1988.
 , Tokyo : Fukutake Shoten, 1990.
 , Tokyo : Chūō Kōronsha, 1992.
 , Tokyo : Shinchōsha, 1993.

References

External links
 Keizo Hino at J'Lit Books from Japan 
 Synopsis of Isle of Dreams (Yume no shima) at JLPP (Japanese Literature Publishing Project) 

1929 births
2002 deaths
Writers from Tokyo
Japanese writers
Akutagawa Prize winners
Deaths from cancer in Japan
Deaths from colorectal cancer
20th-century novelists